Clarkesville is a city that is the county seat of Habersham County, Georgia, United States. As of the 2020 census, it had a population of 1,911, up from the 2010 census population of 1,733, up from 1,248 at the 2000 census.

History
Clarkesville was founded in 1821 as the seat of Habersham County. The community was named after John Clark.

Geography
Clarkesville is located in central Habersham County on the south side of the Soquee River, a southwest-flowing tributary of the Chattahoochee River.

Climate

Demographics

2020 census

As of the 2020 United States Census, there were 1,911 people, 709 households, and 402 families residing in the city.

2000 census
As of the census of 2000, there were 1,248 people, 580 households, and 335 families residing in the city. The racial makeup of the city was 90.06% White, 7.77% African American, 0.16% Native American, 0.72% Asian, 0.32% from other races, and 0.96% from two or more races. Hispanic or Latino of any race were 1.36% of the population.

There were 580 households, out of which 20.9% had children under the age of 18 living with them, 42.1% were married couples living together, 13.8% had a female householder with no husband present, and 42.2% were non-families. 39.0% of all households were made up of individuals, and 23.6% had someone living alone who was 65 years of age or older.  The average household size was 2.06 and the average family size was 2.72.

In the city, the population was spread out, with 19.1% under the age of 18, 7.9% from 18 to 24, 25.0% from 25 to 44, 20.8% from 45 to 64, and 27.2% who were 65 years of age or older.  The median age was 44 years. For every 100 females, there were 80.9 males.  For every 100 females age 18 and over, there were 80.0 males.

The median income for a household in the city was $27,880, and the median income for a family was $39,148. Males had a median income of $26,316 versus $23,977 for females. The per capita income for the city was $20,265.  About 9.9% of families and 14.9% of the population were below the poverty line, including 19.8% of those under age 18 and 16.6% of those age 65 or over.

Tourism
Clarkesville is home to Miles Through Time Automotive Museum which is a 501c3 nonprofit history & car museum that was started in 2017 by Sean Mathis with only his grandpa's car a 1959 Cadillac Coupe De Ville.  The museum is located inside of Vintage Garage Antiques which is the back of the Old Clarkesville Mill only a half miles from downtown Clarkesville. Vintage Garage Antiques helps support the mission of Miles Through Time and provides a unique visit to the small town of Clarkesville, Georgia.

Government
The current mayor is Barrie Aycock, the second female mayor in Clarkesville's history. She replaced previous mayor, Dr. Terry Greene.

Education 
The Habersham County School District holds pre-school to grade twelve, and consists of eight elementary schools, three middle schools, and two high schools. The district has 367 full-time teachers and over 5,955 students. North Georgia Technical College is located in Clarkesville.

Notable people 

 Linda Anderson, according to NPR considered "one of the foremost living memory painters".
 Red Barron, football and baseball player
 McKenzie Coan, 2016 Paralympic gold medalist
 Oliver Clyde Fuller,  banker, financier, and golfer
 April Masini, advice columnist, relationship expert and entertainment industry executive
 Johnny Mize, baseball player
 Benjamin Purcell, U.S. Army officer and state legislator

Other
The 2012 film Wanderlust was mostly filmed in Clarkesville, largely near or on New Liberty Road. This message appears at the end of the movie's credits:  "Thank you to the residents of Clarkesville, Georgia, for your hospitality."

References

External links

 

Cities in Georgia (U.S. state)
Cities in Habersham County, Georgia
County seats in Georgia (U.S. state)
Populated places established in 1821
1821 establishments in Georgia (U.S. state)